The Oréos 4X is a 49-places electric midibus of the Gepebus' line of products, from Power Vehicle Innovation. Made for the operating of some urban regular lines, or also a private usage (for example airport shuttles), the Oreos 4X is among the first entirely electric autobuses produced in France. This clean vehicle belongs to a new generation, more efficient for the power than the older models, and therefore helps to reduce the environmental impact of the transport in the cities.

Technical characteristics 
 Maximal speed : more than 
 Range : 
 Energy recovery rate (during brake or deceleration phases) : around 20%
The Oreos 4X uses lithium-ion batteries which can be recharged without the use of a separate battery charger, as a charger is included in the bus.

Equipment 
The Oreos 4X has been designed for the transportation of a maximum number of 49 people, including 25 seated places. The bus can also be equipped with a disabled people access system.

Operation 
The city of Coulommiers (Seine-et-Marne) through Transdev currently operates some Oreos 4X.

See also 

 Electric bus
 Oréos 2X
 Gepebus
 Power Vehicle Innovation
 List of buses

External links
 The Oréos 4X on PVI's website

Battery electric buses
Midibuses
Low-floor buses